Convoy TAG 5 was a trade convoy of merchant ships during the second World War. It was the 5th of the numbered TAG Convoys from Trinidad and Aruba to Guantánamo. Kapitänleutnant Günther Krech (Knight's Cross of the Iron Cross) destroyed three ships from the convoy in two approaches aboard U-558.

Ships in the convoy

References

Bibliography

External links
TAG 5 at convoyweb

TAG 05
Naval battles of World War II involving Canada